Khunik-e Pain (also Romanized as Khūnīk-e Pā’īn and Khūnīk Pā’īn; also known as Khānaq, Khānaq-e Pā’īn, and Khānaq-i-Pāīn) is a village in Qaen Rural District, in the Central District of Qaen County, South Khorasan Province, Iran. At the 2006 census, its population was 399, in 103 families.

References 

Populated places in Qaen County